Hazaribagh Town railway station (station code HZBN) serves the city of Hazaribagh in the state of Jharkhand. It belongs to East Central Railway of Dhanbad division and is located on NH100, Kumhar Toli in Hazaribagh district of Jharkhand state.

Geography

Location

History
This line was announced in Railway Budget 1999 under the rule of Atal Bihari Vajpayee. After a 16 years, this dream was fulfilled on 20 February 2015. It was inaugurated by Prime Minister Narendra Modi along with Jharkhand Governor Syed Ahmad, Chief Minister Raghubar Das, Union Railways Minister Suresh Prabhu, Union Minister of State for Railways Manoj Sinha, Union Minister of State for Finance and Hazaribagh MP Jayant Sinha. 57 km long Hazaribagh–Barkakana section  was opened for passenger trains on 7 December 2016 by Railway Minister Suresh Prabhu in the presence of Chief Minister Raghubar Das. With this now 137 km section of Koderma–Hazaribagh–Ranchi rail project is functional up to Barkakana and only 66 km long Barkakana–Ranchi section remains incomplete which is expected to complete by end of 2020.

Cost of the Project
The project estimated cost for the full stretch between Koderma–Hazaribagh–Barkakana–Ranchi (total length of 200 kilometers) has an estimated cost of INR 3,000 crores. The railway stretch between Hazaribagh to Koderma, a 79.7 kilometer distance, incurred cost of INR 936 crores. During the inception of project in the year 1999, the estimated cost was around INR 332 crores, however over the period of time, the cost has been escalated to nearly INR 936 crores.

Future plans
The Hazaribagh Town railway station is an important railway station of Koderma Barkakana section. The deadline for project completion is set to be March 2018 deadline for Barkakana–Ranchi section. Amid security concerns in the Maoist-hit Ramgarh district the project has been provided with 24-hour security. Also a railway coal siding line has been constructed from Hazaribagh Town to Bandag.

References

External links

Rail construction on track amid security

Dhanbad railway division
Railway stations in Hazaribagh district